Audax Rio de Janeiro Esporte Clube, commonly known as Audax Rio de Janeiro, Audax Rio, or simply as Audax, is a Brazilian football club from São João de Meriti, Rio de Janeiro state. The club competed in the Série D in 2011. The club was formerly known as Sendas Pão de Açúcar Esporte Clube.

Players

History
The club was founded on May 8, 2005, as Sendas Pão de Açúcar Esporte Clube. They won the Campeonato Carioca Third Division in 2007 and the Copa Rio in 2010. They will compete in the Série D in 2011.

Sendas Pão de Açúcar Esporte Clube was renamed to Audax Rio de Janeiro Esporte Clube on July 17, 2011, adopting a new logo and new kits. The owner of the club, Grupo Pão de Açúcar, changed the club's name to bring the team closer to its supporters. Audax was eliminated in the First Stage in the 2011. The club finished in the second position in the Campeonato Carioca Second Division in 2012, and was promoted to the 2013 Campeonato Carioca.

Achievements
Copa Rio: 1
2010

Campeonato Carioca Third Division: 1
2007

 Taça Corcovado: 1
2018

Stadium
Audax Rio de Janeiro Esporte Clube play their home games at Estádio Arthur Sendas. The stadium has a maximum capacity of 1,000 people.

References

External links
 Official website

 
2005 establishments in Brazil
Football clubs in Rio de Janeiro (state)